Choi Kyung-hee (born 25 February 1966) is a South Korean former basketball player who competed in the 1984 Summer Olympics and in the 1988 Summer Olympics.

References

1966 births
Living people
South Korean women's basketball players
Olympic basketball players of South Korea
Basketball players at the 1984 Summer Olympics
Basketball players at the 1988 Summer Olympics
Olympic silver medalists for South Korea
Olympic medalists in basketball
Asian Games medalists in basketball
Basketball players at the 1986 Asian Games
Basketball players at the 1990 Asian Games
Medalists at the 1984 Summer Olympics
Asian Games gold medalists for South Korea
Asian Games silver medalists for South Korea
Medalists at the 1986 Asian Games
Medalists at the 1990 Asian Games
20th-century South Korean women
21st-century South Korean women
Kyung-hee